Achira Eranga (born 9 June 1987) is a Sri Lankan first-class cricketer. He made his List A debut for Sri Lanka Army Sports Club in the 2007–08 Premier Limited Overs Tournament on 8 December 2007. He made his first-class debut for Sri Lanka Air Force Sports Club in Tier B of the 2007–08 Premier Trophy on 1 February 2008. He made his Twenty20 debut for Sri Lanka Cricket Combined XI in the 2009–10 SLC Super Provincial Twenty20 on 24 February 2010.

References

External links
 

1987 births
Living people
Sri Lankan cricketers
Sri Lanka Air Force Sports Club cricketers
Sri Lanka Cricket Combined XI cricketers
Tincomalee District cricketers
People from Galle